The Kara Sea U-boat campaign was a submarine operation in the Arctic waters of the Kara Sea during World War II. Originally intended as Operation Wonderland-II ( II) after Unternehmen Wunderland was protracted after the official end of the operations until 1944.

Background 
Unternehmen Wunderland (Operation Wonderland) was a coordinated raid of the pocket battleship Admiral Scheer and U-boats in the Kara Sea occurred in 1942, resulting in a limited German success. A follow-up similar operation code-named  II was planned for 1 August 1943 with involvement of the Lützow but her participation was cancelled. Despite the official end of  II for 4 October 1943, operations in Kara Sea resumed the following year until 4 October 1944.

II 
Since August 1943 U-255 operated near Novaya Zemlya as a refuelling station for a BV 138.  The BV 138 searched for Kara Sea convoys to be attacked by Lützow and the Wiking Gruppe.
 On 25 July 1943, Soviet minesweeper T-904 sunk on a mine laid by U-625.
 On 27 July 1943, U-255 shelled and sunk the Soviet survey ship Akademik Shokalskij (ru).
 On 30 July 1043, U-703 sunk the Soviet minesweeper T-911.
 On 5 August 1943, the Soviet motorboat Majakovski (80 tons) sunk on a mine laid by U-212.
 On 25 August 1943, the Soviet salvage ship ASO-1 Shkval sunk on a mine laid by U-625.
 On 27 August 1943, U-354 damaged the Soviet merchant Petrovskij (3771 GRT).
 On 28 August 1943, U-302 sunk the Soviet merchant Dikson (2920 GRT). On the same day, the Soviet submarine S-101 intercepted and sunk U-639 (the only German loss of the 1943 campaign).
 On 6 September 1943, the Soviet merchant Tbilisi (7169 GRT) with a cargo of coal, sunk on a mine laid by U-636.
 On 30 September 1943, U-960 sunk the Soviet merchant Arkhangel´sk (2480 GRT) with a cargo of machinery equipment, part of the Soviet convoy VA-18.
 On 1 October 1943, U-960 attacked convoy VA-18 again, sinking the minesweeper T-896. U-703 attacked the same convoy, sinking the merchant Sergej Kirov (4146 GRT) with a cargo of machinery equipment.

1944 

 On 12 August 1944, U-365 attacked the Soviet convoy BD-5: she sunk in succession the minesweepers T-118, T-114 and finally the merchant Marina Raskova (7540 GRT). Of 632 men from the ships, only 186 were saved by minesweeper T-116 and 73 by MBR-2 flying boats.
 On 26 August 1944, U-957 sunk with gunfire the Soviet survey vessel Nord. The ship could fire a single shell in defence (missed) before being sunk.
 On 5 September 1944, Soviet minesweeper T-116 sunk with depth charges U-362.
 On 23 September 1944, U-957 attacked the Soviet convoy VD-1 sinking the corvette Brilliant.
 On 24 September 1944, U-739 too attacked convoy VD-1, sinking minesweeper T-120.

Aftermath 
The German operations in the Kara Sea had no effect on Soviet industrial production and the Soviet shipping was only disrupted for a short time. The German operations managed to divert Soviet forces from the operations close Norway.

Footnotes

References

 
 

Naval battles of World War II involving Germany
Naval battles of World War II involving the Soviet Union